Denis Rukundo (born 12 December 1996) is a Rwandan professional footballer who plays as a midfielder for Police FC and the Rwanda national team.

Professional career
Rukundo began his career in his native Uganda with Maroons FC and KCCA FC, before moving to Uganda with APR F.C. in 2017. On 20 August 2019, he returned to Uganda signing a contract with Police FC.

International career
Rukundo was born in Uganda to a Rwandan father and Ugandan mother. He was called up to represent the Rwanda national team for a pair of friendlies in June 2021. He debuted with Rwanda in a friendly 2–0 win over Central African Republic on 3 June 2021.

References

External links
 
 

1996 births
Living people
Rwandan footballers
Rwanda international footballers
Ugandan footballers
Rwandan people of Ugandan descent
Ugandan people of Rwandan descent
Uganda Premier League players
Rwanda National Football League players
APR F.C. players
Association football fullbacks
Sportspeople from Kampala